The 2018 United States Shadow Senator election in the District of Columbia took place on November 6, 2018, to elect a shadow member to the United States Senate to represent the District of Columbia. The member was only recognized by the District of Columbia and not officially sworn or seated by the United States Senate. Incumbent Mike Brown was re-elected to a third term.

Democratic primary 
The Democratic primary took place on Tuesday, June 19, 2018. About 76% of registered voters in the District of Columbia were registered with the Democratic Party, compared with only 6% of registered Republicans. The winner of the Democratic primary almost always wins the general election.

Candidates 
 Mike D. Brown, incumbent Shadow Senator
 Andria Thomas, business strategist and activist

Campaign 
Thomas' campaign raised $44,000 and spent $34,800. Brown's campaign raised and spent only $12,000 and $1,200, respectively.

Thomas' campaign accused Brown of coasting on the name recognition of another D.C. politician, Michael A. Brown, a black former-councilman who remained popular in spite of a federal bribery conviction. Michael D. Brown dismissed the claim in an article for The Washington Post saying, "the implication that I win because African Americans are too uninformed to realize there are two people with a common name is insulting to the hundreds of thousands of D.C. voters who have supported my campaigns."

Endorsements

Results

D.C. Statehood Green primary

Candidates 
 Eleanor Ory

Results

Independents

Candidates 
 Professor Alpha Bah Esq., MBA
 Marcus D. Thompson

General election

Candidates 
 Michael D. Brown (Democratic), incumbent U.S. Senator
 Eleanor Ory (D.C. Statehood Green)
 Professor Alpha Bah Esq., MBA (Independent)
 Marcus D. Thompson (Independent)

Results

References 

United States Shadow Senator
2018